Fluid UI is a browser-based wireframing and prototyping tool developed by Fluid Software and used to design mobile touch interfaces.

History
Fluid Software is an Irish software development company founded in August 2010 by Dave Kearney and Ian Hannigan. The company began work on its first product Fluid UI in January 2011 and entered private beta on December of the same year. The beta saw over 3000 users trialling the software. Fluid UI was launched on the 4th of July 2012.

Overview
Fluid UI is an HTML5 mobile interface prototyping tool that helps the user interface designer to rapidly create prototypes  by arranging pre-built widgets into a drag-and-drop WYSIWYG editor during the requirements stage of app development. It enables iteration and collaboration between user and client. Platforms supported include Android, Android Tablet, iPhone and iPad.

Technology
Fluid UI is built with the latest web technologies HTML5, CSS3 and JavaScript. Open source libraries are also integrated into the tool - primarily jQuery. The editor UI uses a fixed Zooming User Interface (ZUI) and an Infinite canvas layout model for content display. The visual linking system is built with a combination of HTML5 canvas and CSS3.

See also 
 Rapid Application Development
 Prototyping
 Website wireframe
 Rapid prototyping
 Software Prototyping
 Mock-up
 Human–computer interaction

References

External links
Official Website
Fluid UI Editor

Rich web applications
Web frameworks
Mashup (web application hybrid)
Software companies of Ireland